The 1995–96 English Hockey League season took place from October 1995 until April 1996.

The Men's National League was won by Cannock with the Women's National League going to Hightown. 

The Men's Hockey Association Cup was won by Reading and the AEWHA Cup was won by Ipswich.

Men's National League First Division League Standings

Women's National League Premier Division League Standings

Men's Cup (Hockey Association Cup)

Quarter-finals

Semi-finals

Final 
(Held at Milton Keynes on 28 April)

Women's Cup (AEWHA Cup)

Quarter-finals

Semi-finals

Final 
(Held at Milton Keynes on 19 May)

Ipswich
Jo Thompson, Lorraine Catchpole, Lisa Copeland, Annette Strange, Colleen Adcock, Lucy Youngs, Sandy Lister (capt), Tracy Fry, Debbie Rawlinson, Jane Smith, Leisa King Subs Sarah Bamfield, Vickey Dixon, Kirsten Spencer
Clifton
Claire Burr, Sue Brimble,; N Swan, Rachel O'Bryan (capt), Elaine Basterfield, A Wright, Michelle Robertson, Lorraine Marsden, Charlotte Merrett, Lucy Culliford, Ros Gollop Subs P Wiltshire, C Britten, J Scullion

References 

1995
field hockey
field hockey
1996 in field hockey
1995 in field hockey